Charlie Troughton (24 July 1906 – 20 January 1984) was an  Australian rules footballer who played with South Melbourne in the Victorian Football League (VFL).

Notes

External links 

1906 births
1984 deaths
Australian rules footballers from New South Wales
Sydney Swans players
North Broken Hill Football Club players